The TABA Fairchild FH-227 accident happened on 12 June 1982 when a twin-engined Fairchild FH-227B (registered in Brazil as PT-LBV) on an internal scheduled passenger flight from Eirunepé Airport to Tabatinga International Airport crashed in bad weather. On approach to land at Tabatinga, the aircraft hit a lighting tower and crashed into a car park; the aircraft exploded and burned, and all 44 on board were killed.

Aircraft
The aircraft was a Fairchild FH-227B twin-engined turboprop that had been built in the United States in 1967 for Mohawk Airlines. After a number of owners it was bought by TABA in June 1981.

References
Citations

Bibliography

Accidents and incidents involving the Fairchild F-27
Aviation accidents and incidents in Brazil
Aviation accidents and incidents in 1982
June 1982 events in South America